The 2009 Superfinalen was the first edition of Superfinalen, an annual football match contested by the winners of the previous season's Tippeligaen and Norwegian Cup competitions. It was played on 8 March 2009, at Telenor Arena in Bærum, between Stabæk and Vålerenga, winners of the 2008 Tippeligaen and 2008 Norwegian Football Cup respectively. A collaboration between the Football Association of Norway, Norsk Toppfotball, the incumbent league and cup champions, and the broadcaster TV 2, the match was seen as a test of the viability of a Super Cup in Norway. Modeled on the FA Community Shield, the Superfinalen is intended to be a season opener, with the net proceeds of each match going to charity. In 2009, these proceeds were donated to UNICEF.

The game was a repeat of the 2008 Norwegian Football Cup Final, in which Vålerenga had defeated Stabæk 4–1. This time, however, it was Stabæk who won the match 3–1 after goals by Daniel Nannskog, Daigo Kobayashi and Pálmi Rafn Pálmason. Mohammed Abdellaoue scored for the losing side.

The game also served as the official opening match of Telenor Arena, which became Stabæk's home ground from 2009 to 2011.

Match details

See also
2008 Tippeligaen
2008 Norwegian Football Cup

References

2009
Superfinalen
Stabæk Fotball matches
Vålerenga Fotball matches